She's So Cool was the only single release by the singer songwriter Catherine Porter for Jive Records. Released in 2002, it contained the non album track Blame, plus the fan favourite Crazy.  Despite a push from  Brian May's website, and strong support from BBC Radio 2, neither the single or the album were promoted and both failed to chart.

Track listing
 She's So Cool
 Crazy (Catherine Porter/Tony Moore)
 Blame

All tracks written by Catherine Porter and Kevin Malpass except where noted.

Personnel 
 Vocals: Catherine Porter
 Keyboards: James Pearson
 Bass: Norman Watt-Roy
 Drums: Dylan Howe
 Guitars: John Themis
 Cello: Tony Peace
 Oboe: John Anderson
 Saxophone, Flute: Snake Davis
 Trombone: Neil Sidwell
 Strings: Gavin Wright
 Produced by Kevin Malpass
 Recorded and mixed by Simon Smart

2002 songs